The Myanmar Premier League (since 2005 simply Myanmar League) was the top division of Burmese football in Myanmar from 1996 to 2009. The league consisted of Yangon-based football clubs, made up mostly of clubs run by various government ministries plus a few private football clubs. Founded in 1996, the league was an attempt to reform the Burma First Division football, which consisted of all government ministry run football clubs, by allowing private football clubs. Nonetheless, the Yangon-based league never gained traction with Burmese fans, and has been replaced by the Myanmar National League, the country's first ever professional league since March 2009. Finance and Revenue was the most successful club in the history of MPL, winning a total of 9 out of 13 championships.

History
For the 2005/06 season, the league was renamed from Myanmar Premier League to Myanmar League in an effort to become a professional league. Matches so far played on random days throughout the week were only played on weekend from that point onwards.

Winners
The winners are:
1996: Finance and Revenue
1997: Finance and Revenue
1998: Yangon City Development
1999: Finance and Revenue
2000: Finance and Revenue
2001: not known
2002: Finance and Revenue
2003: Finance and Revenue
2004: Finance and Revenue
2005: Finance and Revenue
2006: Finance and Revenue
2007: Kanbawza
2008: Kanbawza
2009: Commerce

See also
 Football in Burma
 Myanmar Football Federation
 Myanmar national football team

References

 
Premier
Defunct top level football leagues in Asia